Lee Chang-Woo (born 12 May 1983), also known as Lee Chang-Wu, is a South Korean handball player who competed in the 2004 and 2012 Summer Olympics.

References

External links
  

1983 births
Living people
People from Changwon
South Korean male handball players
Handball players at the 2004 Summer Olympics
Handball players at the 2012 Summer Olympics
Olympic handball players of South Korea
Kyung Hee University alumni
Handball players at the 2010 Asian Games
Handball players at the 2014 Asian Games
Handball players at the 2018 Asian Games
Asian Games gold medalists for South Korea
Asian Games silver medalists for South Korea
Asian Games bronze medalists for South Korea
Asian Games medalists in handball
Medalists at the 2010 Asian Games
Medalists at the 2014 Asian Games
Medalists at the 2018 Asian Games
Sportspeople from South Gyeongsang Province
21st-century South Korean people